Castellaniella fermenti is a Gram-negative and aerobic bacterium from the genus Castellaniella which has been isolated from fermented food from Taiwan.

References

Burkholderiales
Bacteria described in 2018